Vercel Inc., formerly Zeit, is an American cloud platform as a service company. The company maintains the Next.js web development framework.

Vercel's architecture is built around Jamstack, and deployments are handled through Git repositories. Vercel is a member of the MACH Alliance.

History
Vercel was founded by Guillermo Rauch in 2015 as Zeit. Rauch had previously created the realtime event-driven communication library Socket.IO. Zeit was rebranded to Vercel in April 2020, although retained the company's triangular logo.

In June 2021, Vercel raised $102 million in a Series C funding round. As of November 2021, the company is valued at $2.5 billion.

Acquisitions
On December 9, 2021, Vercel acquired Turborepo.

On October 25, 2022, Vercel acquired Splitbee.

Architecture
Deployments through Vercel are handled through Git repositories, with support for GitHub, GitLab, and Bitbucket repositories. Deployments are automatically given a subdomain under the vercel.app domain, although Vercel offers support for custom domains for deployments.

Vercel's infrastructure uses Amazon Web Services and Cloudflare.

Reception
Vercel's clientele includes Airbnb, Uber, GitHub, Nike, Ticketmaster, Carhartt, IBM, and McDonald's.

References

Bibliography

Citations

American companies established in 2015
Companies based in San Francisco
Blog hosting services
Cloud computing providers
Cloud infrastructure
Cloud platforms
Content delivery networks
Free web hosting services
Git (software)
Internet technology companies of the United States
Web service providers
Project hosting websites
Software companies established in 2015